Guyana competed at the 2019 Pan American Games in Lima, Peru from July 26 to August 11, 2019.

On July 14, 2019 the Guyana Olympic Association announced the full team of 26 athletes (17 men and nine women) competing in eight sports.

During the opening ceremony of the games, boxer Keevin Allicock carried the flag of the country as part of the parade of nations.

Competitors
The following is the list of number of competitors (per gender) participating at the games per sport/discipline.

Athletics (track and field)

Guyana qualified four athletes (one man and three women).

Key
Note–Ranks given for track events are for the entire round
q = Qualified for the next round as a fastest loser or, in field events, by position without achieving the qualifying target
DNF = Did not finish

Track events

Field event

Badminton

Guyana qualified a team of two badminton athletes (one per gender).

Boxing

Guyana qualified one male boxer.

Men

Rugby sevens

Guyana qualified a men's team of 12 athletes, by finishing as runner ups at the 2018 RAN Sevens.

Men's tournament

Roster
Guyana's roster of 12 athletes was officially named on July 14, 2019.

Vallon Adams
Lancelot Adonis
Jamal Angus
Godfrey Broomes
Claudius Butts
Avery Corbin
Selwyn Henry
Patrick King
Ronald Mayers
Ozie McKenzie
Dwayne Schroeder
Richard Staglon
Peabo Hamilton

Pool stage

5th-8th classification

Seventh place match

Squash

Guyana qualified a women's team of three athletes. The team was officially named on July 14, 2019.

Women
Singles and Doubles 

Team

Swimming

Guyana received two universality spots in swimming to enter one man and one woman.

Table tennis

Guyana qualified one female table tennis athlete.

Women

Taekwondo

Guyana received one wildcard in the men's 68 kg event.

Kyorugi
Men

See also
Guyana at the 2020 Summer Olympics

References

Nations at the 2019 Pan American Games
2019
2019 in Guyanese sport